"Tennessee Bird Walk" is a 1970 novelty single by the country music husband-and-wife duo Jack Blanchard & Misty Morgan. The single was the duo's second release on the country charts and became their most successful single. "Tennessee Bird Walk" went to number one on the country charts for two weeks and spent a total of sixteen weeks on the chart. The single also crossed over to the Top 40 peaking at number twenty-three.

Content
It is a novelty song theorizing on the effects of removing the wings, feathers, singing ability, and common sense from birds, along with birdbaths and the trees in which the birds reside. According to the first verse, these removals will result in "bald headed birds[…]walking southward in their dirty underwear".

Chart performance

References

Novelty songs
1970 singles
Jack Blanchard & Misty Morgan songs
1970 songs
Songs about birds